Serhiy Tretyak (born 28 November 1984) is a Ukrainian footballer who plays for FC Sioni Bolnisi in Georgia.

He spent his career in the Ukrainian and Israeli football clubs.

Statistics

References

External links
 
 
 

1984 births
Living people
Footballers from Kyiv
Ukrainian footballers
Association football forwards
FC Borysfen Boryspil players
FC Borysfen-2 Boryspil players
FC Arsenal Kyiv players
FC Krasyliv players
FC Obolon-Brovar Kyiv players
FC Obolon-2 Kyiv players
FC Stal Alchevsk players
FC Volyn Lutsk players
FC Poltava players
FC CSKA Kyiv players
Maccabi Netanya F.C. players
Maccabi Yavne F.C. players
FC Merani Martvili players
FC Sioni Bolnisi players
FC Lyubomyr Stavyshche players
Ukrainian Premier League players
Ukrainian First League players
Israeli Premier League players
Erovnuli Liga players
Ukrainian expatriate footballers
Expatriate footballers in Israel
Ukrainian expatriate sportspeople in Israel
Expatriate footballers in Georgia (country)
Ukrainian expatriate sportspeople in Georgia (country)